, born , was a member of the Imperial House of Japan, the wife of Emperor Shōwa (Hirohito) and the mother of Emperor Emeritus Akihito. She was empress consort of Japan (皇后 kōgō) from 25 December 1926 until her husband's death on 7 January 1989, making her the longest-serving empress consort in Japanese history. Her posthumous name is Kōjun (香淳), which means "fragrant purity".

Early life

Princess Nagako was born in Kuni-no-miya's family home in Tokyo, Japan on 6 March 1903, into one of the Ōke branches of the Imperial House of Japan, which were eligible to provide an heir to the throne of Japan (by adoption). She was therefore a princess by birth, as the daughter of Kuniyoshi, Prince Kuni (1873–1929) by his consort, Chikako (1879–1956). While her father was a scion of the imperial family itself, her mother descended from daimyōs, the feudal or military aristocracy. Nagako would become one of the last Japanese who could remember what life was like inside the Japanese aristocracy in the years before the Second World War.

As a young girl, Nagako attended the Girls' Department of Peers' School in Tokyo (now Gakushūin), which was a school set up especially for the daughters of the aristocracy and imperial family. Among her cohort was Crown Princess Bangja of Korea (then known as Princess Masako Nashimoto). Following her betrothal at age fourteen, Nagako was withdrawn from this school and began a six-year training program aimed at developing the accomplishments deemed necessary for an empress.

Marriage and children

Nagako was betrothed to her distant cousin the Crown Prince Hirohito, later the Emperor Shōwa (1901–1989) at a very young age, in a match arranged by their parents, which was usual in Japanese society at that time. Her lineage and her father's unblemished military career were the major considerations. In a step away from tradition, Hirohito was allowed to choose his own bride. Nagako herself had no choice in the matter. In 1917, at the age of 14, she and other eligible women participated in a tea ceremony at the Imperial Palace while the Crown Prince watched unseen from behind a screen. He eventually selected Nagako. Prime Minister Yamagata Aritomo, a prince from a rival clan, was said to be opposed to Hirohito's choice. He and other royal clans tried to dissuade him from marrying her, arguing that she had colour-blind relatives on her mother's side of the family. In January 1919, the engagement of Princess Nagako to the then-Crown Prince Hirohito was announced. During their six-year courtship, they met only nine times and were always accompanied by a chaperon.

Princess Nagako married the Crown Prince Hirohito on 26 January 1924 and became the Crown Princess of Japan. The wedding had been delayed in the aftermath of the 1923 Great Kantō earthquake and following an assassination attempt on Hirohito's life. Their marriage marked the last time a future empress was chosen from minor princely families that usually provided brides for the main line. She became the empress of Japan upon Hirohito's accession to the throne on 25 December 1926. Unlike his royal predecessors, Emperor Hirohito decided to abandon his 39 court concubines. Over the first decade of their marriage, Empress Nagako gave birth to four daughters (see Issue). As she had failed to produce a son, courtiers attempted to persuade the Emperor to take concubines, but he remained monogamous. They also gave her the nickname onna bara, "girl womb" or "girl tummy". There were nationwide celebrations across Japan following his birth, which was described by Nagako as "the happiest moment in my life". In all, Hirohito and Nagako had seven children, five daughters and two sons, three of whom predeceased Nagako. (see Issue)

Empress consort

Empress Nagako performed her ceremonial duties in a traditional manner. She initially came to live in the palace during the time when people spoke an archaic imperial form of Japanese that has largely disappeared. Her role required her to attend special ceremonies such as those for the 2600th anniversary of the legendary foundation of the Empire of Japan in 1940 or the conquest of Singapore in 1942.

During the Second World War, Nagako was largely confined to palace grounds and her duties involved tending to wounded generals and writing to families who had lost loved ones during the war. Their children were sent to the countryside, while she and Hirohito resided at the Obunko imperial air-raid shelter, which was built in the Fukiage Gardens on palace grounds. Nagako also assisted with growing vegetables and raising poultry. Her personal views on the war are not well known, though she is reported to have described the war years as "the hardest time of my life". NHK reported that "her heart was in pain when she saw the emperor deeply agitated every day during and immediately after World War II." After the occupation of Japan, the court became more accepting of Western and foreign traditions and Nagako took English lessons from two American tutors. She also toured different parts of Japan to meet orphans and families who had suffered loss.

It is not clear whether Nagako openly disapproved of her son Akihito's choice of a wife when he decided to marry commoner Michiko Shōda, but it was widely reported in the press that she and her daughter-in-law had a strained relationship. Nagako, who was tradition-conscious, sided with those who criticized Michiko for breastfeeding her children, carrying them in public, and raising them herself. A senior chamberlain claimed in his memoir that Michiko once directly asked her mother-in-law why she disliked her. Michiko also held suspicions about her chief lady-in-waiting, whom she believed was spying on her on the orders of Nagako. Her and Akihito's attempts at dismissing the servant were unsuccessful. The rift between the two women caused Michiko to suffer a nervous breakdown in 1963.

Nagako was the first Japanese empress consort to travel overseas. She accompanied Hirohito on his European tour in 1971 and later on his state visit to the United States in 1975. She also took care of him in later years and chose his attire for him. Hirohito was said to have described their union as a source of solace and contentment. Their marriage lasted nearly 65 years, the longest of any Japanese imperial couple. A talented artist, two collections of Nagako's paintings, which she signed as Toen or Peach Garden, were published and she gifted the UK's Queen Elizabeth II with one of her pieces in 1971. She also wrote waka, a collection of which was published in 1974. She was reported to have enjoyed singing, and played the piano, violin and Japanese harp. Nagako suffered a fall in July 1977, injuring her spine, and following another serious fall was confined to a wheelchair from 1980 for the remainder of her life. The last public ceremony she took part in was her husband's 86th birthday celebrations in April 1987.

Empress dowager
After the Emperor's death on 7 January 1989, she became empress dowager. At that time, she was in failing health herself and did not attend her husband's funeral. She was confined to a wheelchair and remained in seclusion for the rest of her life. A video of her sitting in a wheelchair beside a window was published in 1993. There were also persistant rumours that she was suffering from dementia or Alzheimer's disease. In 1995, she became the longest-living empress dowager of Japan, breaking the record of Empress Kanshi, who had died 868 years earlier.

At the time of her death at the age of 97 in 2000, Nagako had been an empress for 74 years. In her final days, the Imperial Household Agency (IHA) announced that she was suffering from breathing problems but that the illness was not serious and she was on a respirator. On 15 June, the IHA director-general told certain segments of the press that her condition had taken a turn and it was repored that she had slipped into a coma on the next day after her blood pressure dropped. Nagako died at 4:46 pm on 16 June 2000, with her family at her side. Her son Akihito, who had been carrying out public engagements earlier in the day, immediately went to Fukiage Palace and reportedly held his mother's hand as she died. At his request, no injections or intravenous fluids were administered to prevent any suffering. The IHA announced her death at 6:30 pm and gave "old age" as the cause of death. Following the announcement, neon signs in Ginza and the lights in Tokyo Tower were turned off. The flags flew at half-mast on government buildings, and music and dance were excluded from public events for a day. People also gathered outside palace gates to pay their respects.

A mourning period of 150 days was declared by the imperial court. A team was set up by the IHA to organize her funeral, which largely followed the customs implemented at her mother-in-law Empress Teimei's funeral in 1951. Her funeral was held at the Toshimagaoka Imperial Cemetery on 25 July 2000 and was attended by one thousand mourners, including members of the imperial family, government leaders and foreign diplomats. Her son Akihito was the chief mourner during the service, which featured elements of the Shinto religion. Hundreds of mourners also gathered outside cemetery gates.

Emperor Akihito granted his mother the posthumous title of Empress Kōjun, drawing inspiration from the Kaifūsō. Her final resting place is in a mausoleum named Musashino no Higashi no Misasagi, near that of her husband within the Musashi Imperial Graveyard.

Honours

National
  Knight Grand Cordon of the Order of Meiji
  Grand Mistress Paulownia Dame Grand Cordon of the Order of the Precious Crown

Foreign
  Dame Grand Cross of the Order of Leopold I (Belgium)
  Knight of the Order of the Elephant (Denmark)
  Grand Cross of the Order of Merit of the Federal Republic of Germany, Special Class (Germany)
  Grand Cross of the Order of the Redeemer (Greece)
  Member of the Order of the Benevolent Ruler (Kingdom of Nepal)
  Dame Grand Cross of the Order of Isabella the Catholic (Spain)
  Member Grand Cross of the Royal Order of the Seraphim (Sweden)
  Dame of the Order of the Royal House of Chakri (Thailand)
  Dame Grand Cross with Collar of the Order of the Crown of Tonga (Tonga)

Issue
Empress Kōjun and Emperor Shōwa had seven children (two sons and five daughters).

Ancestry

See also
 Empress of Japan
 Ōmiya Palace

Notes

Citations

References
 Connors, Leslie. (1987).  The Emperor's Adviser: Saionji Kinmochi and Pre-war Japanese Politics. London: Routledge. 
 Koyama, Itoko. (1958).  Nagako, Empress of Japan (translation of Kogo sama). New York: J. Day Co. 
 Large, Stephen S. (1992).  Emperor Hirohito and Shōwa Japan:  Political Biography. London: Routledge.

External links

Emperor Shōwa and Empress Kōjun at the Imperial Household Agency website

1903 births
2000 deaths
People from Tokyo
Japanese empresses
Kuni-no-miya
Hirohito

Grand Cordons (Imperial Family) of the Order of the Precious Crown
Recipients of the Order of the Sacred Treasure, 1st class

Grand Crosses Special Class of the Order of Merit of the Federal Republic of Germany
Dames Grand Cross of the Order of Isabella the Catholic